Belle Vue is a suburb of Carlisle, Cumbria, United Kingdom. The ward population taken at the 2011 census was 6,491.

The area is mostly residential and is situated on the western edge of the city's urban area and borders or is close to Newtown, Raffles, Sandsfield Park and Morton West.

It contains a school named Belle Vue Primary School. The area also has a pub (The Museum Inn), A local shop, a hair Salon and two play areas. It's also home to Burgh Road Industrial Estate. The B5307 runs through the area and connects with the A689. Bus route 67 serves the area and is operated by Stagecoach Cumbria & North Lancashire.

References

External links 

Areas of Carlisle, Cumbria